Bright House or BrightHouse may refer to:

Places
 T. B. Bright House and Farmstead, Danville, Kentucky, listed on the National Register of Historic Places in Boyle County, Kentucky
Bright-Lamkin-Easterling House, Monroe, Louisiana, listed on the National Register of Historic Places in Ouachita Parish, Louisiana
 Bright House (Lewistown, Montana), listed on the National Register of Historic Places in Fergus County, Montana
 Alumni House (College of William & Mary), Virginia, formerly known as Bright House

Sports venues
 Bright House Field, a baseball stadium in Clearwater, Florida
 Bright House Networks Stadium, a football stadium in Orlando, Florida

Organisations
 BrightHouse (retailer), a UK retailer
 Brighthouse Financial, a life insurance provider
 Bright House Networks, a defunct cable television provider